Surendra Singh Baghel also known as Honey Baghel (born 17 March 1977) was the Minister of Tourism Department and Narmada Valley Development Department of Madhya Pradesh but resigned due to political turmoil, and also the Member of Legislative Assembly from Kukshi constituency of Madhya Pradesh.

Political career
He was parliamentary Vice president of Indian Youth Congress of Dhar-Mhow parliamentary constituency.
His father Pratap Singh Baghel also contested Assembly elections unsuccessfully on BJP ticket from Kukshi in 2008.

He is dedicated for key issues like tribal empowerment, quality health facilities, quality education, quality sports facilities for tribals and last but not the least women empowerment.

In the year 2013 he won assembly elections from Kukshi constituency of Madhya Pradesh.

Early life and education

Baghel was born in Vadodara, Gujarat on 17 March 1977, the eldest child of renowned politician of Madhya Pradesh Pratap Singh Baghel, former minister in the Government of Madhya Pradesh. He studied at Daly College, Indore before graduating in Barkatullah University in 2001.

Politics

In 2008, he was appointed President of Dhar youth Congress committee of Madhya Pradesh. During his tenure as youth Congress president, he launched many awareness campaigns among tribals of district for their empowerment and from year 2008 to 2013, he organised many footmarches in Kukshi constituency against irrelevant policies of BJP led government of Madhya Pradesh.

In 2013, Congress leadership allotted him party ticket to contest Assembly elections and he defeated sitting MLA of BJP Mukam Singh Kirade (husband of former minister Mrs. Ranjana Baghel) with humongous margin of 42,768 votes.

References
2. https://www.mpinfo.org/MPinfoStatic/English/council/cabinetmin/Shri-Surendra-Singh-Baghel.asp

1977 births
Living people
People from Gujarat
Madhya Pradesh MLAs 2013–2018
People from Vadodara
People from Dhar district
Barkatullah University alumni
Indian National Congress politicians from Madhya Pradesh